San Jose de Buenavista, officially the Municipality of San Jose de Buenavista, , is a 1st class municipality and capital of the province of Antique, Philippines. According to the 2020 census, it has a population of 65,140 people, making it the most populous municipality in the province of Antique. It is often referred to by locals as simply San Jose.

The municipality also hosted the 2017 Palarong Pambansa.

History

The Spaniards arrived in Antique in 1581. With them came Augustinian friars who Christianized the inhabitants. There was no place called San Jose de Buenavista at that time. Its original name was Tubigon being still a part of the municipality of Hamtic. In 1733, it was renamed San José and in 1790 it acquired its municipality through land grants issued by Governor General Félix Berenguer de Marquina. Later, it became a parish with its first parish priest, Father Manuel Ibáñez. Some two hundred years ago, the site now occupied by San José de Buenavista was a dense jungle and a favorite landing place for pirates to raid the area. In 1802, by popular demand, San José de Buenavista became the capital of the province of Antique and Agustín Sumandi was appointed as its first Gobernadorcillo, a sort of local governor during the Spanish colonial era.

On November 24, 1898, San Jose de Buenavista was captured by Philippine Revolutionary Expeditionary Forces led by Gen. Leandro Fullon from Cavite during the Battle of Antique after a 2-day struggle. The rest of the Antique province under Spanish authority surrenders to the revolutionary forces.

In 1954, by the virtue of Executive Order No. 3 of the President of the Philippines, the southern portion of San Jose de Buenavista was formed into an independent municipality under the name of Hamtic. The boundary was described to be "From a point on the south bank of the mouth of Malandog River running northeasterly in a straight imaginary line to a point on the northeast side of the San Jose-Hamtic provincial road ten meters west of the intersection of this northeast side of said road with the northwest side of the Sibalom-Piapi-Malandog provincial road; thence following approximately the same direction in an imaginary line that is parallel to, and ten meters distant from the said Sibalom-Piapi-Malandog provincial road until it touches the present boundary between San Jose and Sibalom."

The Evelio B. Javier Airport, the only airport serving commercial flights in the province of Antique, is located in San Jose.

Geography

According to the Philippine Statistics Authority, the municipality has a land area of  constituting  of the  total area of Antique.

Climate

Barangays
San Jose de Buenavista is politically subdivided into 28 barangays.

Demographics

In the 2020 census, San Jose de Buenavista had a population of 65,140.

Language
Kinaray-a is the spoken language of the municipality. Kinaray-a came from the word "iraya", which refers to a group of people residing in the mountain areas of the province. Hiligaynon is spoken as a second language of the municipality.

Religion
San Jose is the see of the Roman Catholic Diocese of San Jose de Antique.

Economy

Government

Tourism
Since 1971, San Jose de Buenavista celebrates the Binirayan Festival during the final week of December. This festival involves a theatrical presentation commemorating founding of the first Malayan settlement or barangay in the country. San Jose celebrates its religious fiesta on May 1 to honor its patron saint, Saint Joseph the Worker.

Evelio Javier Freedom Park is located in front of the Antique Provincial Capitol building in San Jose de Buenavista. It is named for the late Governor Evelio Javier, who was shot by an unknown assassin on February 11, 1986. A marker in the park denotes the exact place of his death.

Old and new buildings dot the town: the Old Capitol Building; Evelio B. Javier Memorabilia (New Capitol); ADF Handicrafts; Azurin Mansion and Piedra's Restaurant; La Granja and Binirayan Hills; and the San Pedro Old Church.

Notable personalities

Jerry Navarro Elizalde - Philippine National Artist for Visual Arts - Painting
John Iremil Teodoro - Filipino writer, university professor and freelance journalist. He is also a multi-awarded poet and playwright, one of the country's leading pioneers in gay literature and the most published author in Kinaray-a to date.
Alex C. Delos Santos - a Karay-a writer and theater artist based in San Jose, Antique, the Philippines. His research and writing interests are in culture and arts and gay literature.
Richard Yee - Filipino professional basketball player who last played for the Barako Bull Energy Boosters in the Philippine Basketball Association.
Alberto A. Villavert - Filipino Politician who led the Philippine Province of Antique between 1937 and 1946 both as an appointed and elected Governor. 
Sunshine Teodoro - Filipina Actress known for her work on Manila Kingpin: The Asiong Salonga Story (2011), Feng Shui 2 (2014), Social Virus (2014) and Oro(2016)
Marian Capadocia - Tennis player
Jose Romeo Lazo - Archbishop of Jaro

References

External links

 [ Philippine Standard Geographic Code]
 

Municipalities of Antique (province)
Provincial capitals of the Philippines